Kirby Chambliss (born October 18, 1959 in Corpus Christi, Texas) is an American world champion aerobatic and air race pilot who raced in the Red Bull Air Race World Series under the Red Bull brand.

Biography

Chambliss was born in Corpus Christi, Texas, United States. As a boy, he wanted to be a pilot. Chambliss became inspired by watching his father professionally skydive growing up, and was fascinated with the aerial stunts the plane would undergo while chasing the divers as they fell. During his high school years, he fueled aircraft to earn money. By December 1975, at the age of 16, Chambliss debuted in solo flying after formal flight training, and earned his private license the following March. In the beginning, he earned his living as a certified flight instructor and then as a night freight pilot.

His later job as a business jet pilot enabled him in 1985 to take aerobatic flight training and to buy his own aerobatic plane. Winning top honors in his very first contest, Chambliss worked his way up to the elite "unlimited" level. In 1997, he became member and then captain of the US Aerobatic Team. He won five U.S. national championships and 13 medals at the world championships. He holds the title 2000 Men's Freestyle World Champion, and has logged over 27,000 flying hours. In 2013, Chambliss lost power performing a high Alpha pass at the Illopango El Salvador Airshow. Chambliss exited his aircraft with minor injuries after a forced landing on a rocky embankment.

Chambliss enjoys performing in traditional airshows throughout the year when he is not training or competing. Since 2003, he takes part at the international aerobatic competition Red Bull Air Race World Series as a member of the Red Bull team along with his teammate Hungarian Péter Besenyei. He was the champion of 2004, and finished the 2006 Series as the champion again with four wins of eight rounds in his Zivko Edge 540 aircraft. To stay in shape for enormous g-forces and exact timing, he runs four miles five days a week.

He lives with his wife and fellow pilot, Kellie, and their daughter, Karly Nicole, at the Flying Crown Ranch in Arizona, United States.

On January 24, 2020, one of Kirby’s planes was involved in a fatal aircraft crash at Iztapa Airport in Escuintla while under control of his friend Steve Andelin. Steve and two ground spectators were killed in the crash.

Racing record

Complete Red Bull Air Race World Championship results

Legend:
 CAN: Cancelled
 DNP: Did not participate
 DNS: Did not show
 DQ: Disqualified
 NC: Not classified

References

External links

 Team Chambliss official website
 Pilot Profile on Flightglobal.com

1959 births
Living people
People from Corpus Christi, Texas
American air racers
Aviators from Texas
Red Bull Air Race World Championship pilots
Red Bull Air Race World Championship winners
Aerobatic pilots
Commercial aviators